Dui Duari also is a Bangladeshi Bengali-language film. The film was released in 2000. Directed by Bangladeshi famous novelist, film director-writer Humayun Ahmed, produced and distributed by his film producer-distributor company called as Nuhash Chalachitra. Stars include Riaz, Mahfuz Ahmed, Meher Afroz Shaon, Masud Ali Khan, Amirul Haque Chowdhury,  Dr.Ezazul Islam, Shamima Nazneen, Shabnam Parvin, Nasima Khan and many more.

Dui Duari the film special honored is Riaz and most popular singer Sabina Yasmin by National Film Awards of Bangladesh as there won best actor award and best female singer award 2000. Riaz acting a different character as Rahossa Manob().

Plot
'Taru' (Shawon), Taru's father and little brother 'Tagor' goes on a car by forest side road. Unfortunately, a young man 'Rahossa Manob' (Riaz) with a guitar widens his two hands in the middle of the road. Taru's car driver wants to brake to save the man, but it was impossible. So, a small accident occurs. Taru's father takes Rahossa Manob in their car and takes home. Rahossa Manob in the meantime feels good, Taru's father sent him some money with his servant 'Mobarak' (Dr. Ejajul Islam). But Mobarak arranges him a rickshaw and 100 money. Sometime later Rahossa Manob come back to Taru's home. Taru does not like him but Tagor likes him a lot.
Taru' and 'Shafiq Ahmed' (Mahfuz Ahmed) love each other. And Taru decides to wait for Shafiq until he finds a good job. Taru's aunt (Shamima Nazneen) is locked in a room and her leg is tied with a chain, because she is a mentally ill. One day, Taru's aunt goes out of the room and attempts to hit Togor's Teacher (Amirul Haque Chowdhury) as he scolded her (Taru's aunt's) loved nephew, Tagor. At the time Rahossa Manob calls Taru's aunt and Taru's aunt stands up and seeing him she cools down and becomes ok. Rahossa Manob gives an advice to Taru's father about informing his sister that, she had become well and she doesn't need to be locked-up anymore. And after fixing all the problems in Taru's home, Rahossa Manob wears his hat and takes his guitar and goes down to the road, then he goes to the place in which the accident took place. And widens his hand, just like as he did before.

Cast
 Riaz as Rahossa Manob
 Meher Afroz Shaon as Taru
 Mahfuz Ahmed as Shafiq Ahmed
 Dr.Ezazul Islam as Mobarak Miah
 Masud Ali Khan as Taru's Father
 Nasima Khan as Taru's Mother
 Shabnam Parvin as Kudrati Begum
 Amirul Haque Chowdhury as Tagor's Teacher
 Shamima Nazneen as Taru's Aunt
 Dr. Karim
 Shuvro as Togor
 Jajal Islam
 Majibur Rahman
 Deepak Kumar Sur
 Pranesh Chowdhury
 E T Naser
 Cameo
Challenger as a train passenger

Music

Dui Duari film music directed by Maksud Jamil Mintu. And lyrics by the film director Humayun Ahmed. But the films used a song named Lilabali Lilabali collected from Bangladeshi old cultures and a Rabindra Sangeet, titled Dure Kothao.

Soundtrack

Award and achievements

National Film Awards
 Winner Best Actor, Riaz 2000
 Winner Best Female Singer, Sabina Yasmin 2000 (song as Barshar Prothom Dine)

References

External links
 
 

2000 films
2000s mystery drama films
Bengali-language Bangladeshi films
Bangladeshi mystery drama films
Films based on Bangladeshi novels
Films scored by Maksud Jamil Mintu
Films directed by Humayun Ahmed
2000s Bengali-language films
2000 drama films